The Australia national under-18 baseball team is the national under-18 team representing Australia in international baseball competitions. The organization is currently ranked 10th in the world by the World Baseball Softball Confederation.  They compete in the bi-annual U-18 Baseball World Cup. They have finished 2nd once and 3rd four times in the tournament.

See also
 Australia national baseball team
 Australian Baseball Federation
 U-18 Baseball World Cup

References

National under-18
National under-18 baseball teams
Baseball